Neo Psychiko is a suburb in the northeastern part of the Athens agglomeration, Greece. Since the 2011 local government reform it is part of the municipality Filothei-Psychiko, of which it is a municipal unit. The municipality has an area of 1.000 km2.

Overview
It is located 5 km northeast of central Athens, between Kifisias Avenue to the northwest and Mesogeion Avenue to the southeast. Formerly part of Chalandri, Neo Psychiko was recognised as a separate community in 1946 and as a municipality in July 1982.

Historical population

See also
List of municipalities of Attica

References

External links

official website 

Populated places in North Athens (regional unit)